The first light navigational structure in Albania was built in the north-western side of Sazan Island in 1871. More than a decade later, in 1884, a second structure was erected in Shëngjin. Between the years from 1878–1890, maritime experts from the Austro-Hungarian Empire drafted the first hydrographic maps in the country which were further improved by Italian experts during the period from 1933–1941. They planted new light navigational structures at the main entry points of the coast, in places such as: Durrës, Vlorë and Sarandë (Çukë). After the war, some major headlights were repaired and in collaboration with Soviet maritime specialists, new maps were published for the entire coast and marine region.

Lanterns powered by acetylene gas were put into operation and some of the older lanterns were refurbished with new parts. From 1958–1960, concrete and stone lantern towers of 8–14 m in height were built in the Cape of Panorma, south of the island of Sazan, in Shën Vasil, Pashaliman, Treport, Selita Cape, atop the Durrës Mountain, etc. From 1984–1986, two new beacon towers were built with the architecture of the time, one at the mouth of Vjosa River (20 m) and the other at Pali Cape (14 m).  After 1985, some lamps were fitted with automatic electronic equipment, which increased their vision and reduced electricity consumption by 40%. At this time, more than 40 marine lanterns were numbered on the Albanian coast, covering the coastal waters at a range of 6 to 13 nautical miles, and in some capes up to 25 nautical miles. Presently there are a total of 84, mostly functional, lanterns from Buna to Saranda in full alert.

Lighthouses, buoys, maritime navigational marks
This table shows a complete list of lighthouses, buoys and other navigational marks spread throughout the coast of Albania.

The lantern icons displayed in the table above are precise graphical recreations of the light navigational structures found along the coastal waters of Albania. The yellow light bulb icon represents in fact color white but due to technical limitations that made it difficult to properly display a white bulb in the current table background, yellow was the closest color chosen.

See also
 Lists of lighthouses and lightvessels
 Albanian Hydrographic Service

References

Albania
Lighthouses
Lighthouses